Baliochila megadentata is a butterfly in the family Lycaenidae. It is found in central Tanzania. Its habitat consists of moist montane forests.

Adults have been recorded on wing in February.

References

Butterflies described in 2004
Poritiinae
Endemic fauna of Tanzania
Butterflies of Africa